Telephone numbers in Taiwan use a system of area codes, beginning 02 to 08. The leading digit(s) following the area code denote the network operator (Chunghwa Telecom and its competitors). Mobile numbers begin 09. The international code for calls into Taiwan is 886.

Area codes

Source:

The emergency numbers in Taiwan are 110 (police) and 119 (fire and ambulance services).

When making an inter-area long-distance call from within Taiwan, a long-distance prefix "0" is required. If calls are made from within the same area code, then the area code does not need to be included. Inter-area calls are defined as long-distance phone calls even when the two numbers have the same prefix.

If calls are made from outside Taiwan, the "0" of the area code prefix is omitted.

The following table of area codes includes this "0" prefix.

Mobile phones
Taiwan mobile phone numbers always begin with 09 followed by 8 digits (e.g. 0918909875). The 0 is omitted when calling a Taiwan mobile phone number from outside Taiwan (e.g. +886 970699044). If calling a landline within Taiwan from a local Taiwan mobile phone, the 0 of area code prefix must be included (e.g. 0 + area code + 8 digit landline number).

Prefixes: (09)XXXX-XXXX

896-786

Mobile Phones (090 range is mostly used for wireless data services, M2M).

Toll-free and premium rate
Toll-free numbers begin with the prefix 0800 and 0809.

Numbers in the 020x prefix are used for value-added services:

International dialling
International dialling from Taiwan follows the following pattern:
 Carrier selection code – Country calling code – Area code (if required, usually for landlines) – Subscriber number
Carrier selection codes, which direct the call via one of several providers, are as follows:

 002 – Chunghwa Telecom
 005 – Asia Pacific Telecom
 006 – Taiwan Mobile
 007 – Far EasTone
 009 – Chunghwa Telecom

Country calling code 
The international dialling code for making calls to Taiwan, and the other islands under the control of the Republic of China government, is 886.

International dialling codes were assigned by the International Telecommunication Union (ITU), an agency of the United Nations, to its member states and their dependencies in the 1960s. Despite the Republic of China on Taiwan still being a member of the UN, and hence the ITU, other member states declared that "the only representatives of the people of China are the delegates to the ITU and its permanent organs appointed by the Central Government of the People's Republic of China". This led to the People's Republic of China being assigned the country code 86. Consequently, in the early 1970s, Taiwan had to be unofficially assigned a separate code, 886, although there was pressure from China to change this to 866. This had to be listed as "reserved", but in 2006, the code was formally allocated to "Taiwan, China".

References

External links
ITU allocations list

Taiwan
Telecommunications in Taiwan
Taiwan communications-related lists